The North West women's cricket team, also known as North West Dragons, is the women's representative cricket team for the South African province of North West. They compete in the Women's Provincial Programme and the CSA Women's Provincial T20 Competition.

History
North West Women first played in the 1996–97 season, appearing in the Women's Inter-Provincial Tournament. They have competed in the provincial one-day tournament ever since. They finished as runners-up in the 1998–99 tournament, losing in the final to Northerns. They joined the CSA Women's Provincial T20 Competition for its inaugural year in 2012–13.

They won their first one-day title in 2016–17, beating Gauteng in the final, where Lizelle Lee scored 84 and took 4/20 from 4.3 overs. They won their second title two seasons later, in 2018–19, this time beating Western Province in the final. That season they completed the double by winning their first T20 title, going unbeaten in the tournament. The following season, 2019–20, they retained their one-day title, by virtue of topping the group on average points when the season was curtailed due to the COVID-19 pandemic. When the T20 Competition was similarly curtailed, North West ended as runners-up. In 2021–22, they claimed their fourth one-day title, winning the Top 6 league of the Women's Provincial Programme.

Players

Current squad
Based on appearances in the 2021–22 season. Players in bold have international caps.

Notable players
Players who have played for North West and played internationally are listed below, in order of first international appearance (given in brackets):

  Alicia Bezuidenhout (1997)
  Cindy Eksteen (1997)
  Sunette Viljoen (2000)
  Cri-Zelda Brits (2002)
  Masabata Klaas (2010)
  Elriesa Theunissen-Fourie (2013)
  Lizelle Lee (2013)
  Sinalo Jafta (2016)
  Anneke Bosch (2016)
  Zintle Mali (2018) 
  Tazmin Brits (2018)
  Tumi Sekhukhune (2018)
  Saarah Smith (2018)
  Sune Wittmann (2019)
  Delmi Tucker (2022)

Honours
 CSA Women's Provincial Programme:
 Winners (4): 2016–17, 2018–19, 2019–20 & 2021–22
 CSA Women's Provincial T20 Competition:
 Winners (1): 2018–19

See also
 North West (cricket team)

References

Women's cricket teams in South Africa
Cricket in North West (South African province)